3rd Earl of Sussex may refer to:

Thomas Radclyffe, 3rd Earl of Sussex (1525–1583)
Henry Yelverton, 3rd Earl of Sussex (1728–1799), heir of Talbot Yelverton, 1st Earl of Sussex

See also
Earl of Sussex